Gun laws in Wyoming regulate the sale, possession, and use of firearms and ammunition in the state of Wyoming in the United States. Gun laws in Wyoming rank as some of the most permissive in the country.

Summary table

Wyoming laws
According to the Office of the Attorney General of Wyoming, Wyoming state law (W.S. § 6-8-104) provides for the issuance of concealed firearm permits. As a "shall issue" state, the local sheriff's office is required to issue a permit upon request, unless there is a valid reason to deny (such as violent felony conviction). A Wyoming permit is valid for 5 years.

Wyoming also recognizes concealed firearms permits from states with similar licensing requirements (subject to frequent review and revision), which, as of March 2016, includes: Alabama, Alaska, Arizona, Arkansas, Colorado, Florida, Georgia, Idaho, Indiana, Iowa, Kansas, Kentucky, Louisiana, Maine, Michigan, Mississippi, Missouri, Montana, Nebraska, Nevada, New Hampshire, New Mexico, North Carolina, North Dakota, Ohio, Oklahoma, Pennsylvania, South Carolina, South Dakota, Tennessee, Texas, Utah, Virginia, West Virginia and Wisconsin. Many of these states reciprocate and accept a Wyoming permit as valid, however this is a frequently changing and often unspecified distinction. Independent confirmation by directly contacting the attorney general of the state in question is recommended.

Effective July 2011, Wyoming became an unrestricted concealed carry state (for residents only), following the example of Vermont, Alaska and Arizona. Concealed carry permits will still be issued to be used as reciprocal permits in certain states. On April 6th 2021, Governor Mark Gordon signed a bill extending permitless concealed carry to non-residents as well. Open carry is allowed without a permit for residents and non-residents. 

Some counties in Wyoming have adopted Second Amendment sanctuary resolutions.

References

Wyoming law
Wyoming